Loginovo is a rural locality (a village) in Komyanskoye Rural Settlement, Gryazovetsky District, Vologda Oblast, Russia. The population was 11 as of 2002.

Geography 
Loginovo is located 22 km north of Gryazovets (the district's administrative centre) by road. Novoye-na-Komye is the nearest rural locality.

References 

Rural localities in Gryazovetsky District